Ice sledge speed racing at the 1980 Winter Paralympics consisted of fourteen events, eight for men and six for women.

Medal table

Medal summary 
The competition events were:

100 m: men - women
500 m: men - women
800 m: - women
1500 m: men

Each event had separate sitting classifications:

Men
I - sitting: paraplegia with fair functional sitting balance
II - sitting: paraplegia with fair functional sitting balance
III - sitting: paraplegia with no or some upper abdominal function and no functional sitting balance
Women
IV - sitting: paraplegia with fair functional sitting balance
V - sitting: paraplegia with no or some upper abdominal function and no functional sitting balance

Men's events

Women's events

See also
Speed skating at the 1980 Winter Olympics

References 

 

1980 Winter Paralympics events
1980